Carlos Eduardo Alzate Escobar (born March 23, 1983 in Tuluá, Valle del Cauca) is a Colombian professional track and road racing cyclist from Colombia, who most recently rode for the  team. He won a silver medal for his native country at the 2007 Pan American Games in Rio de Janeiro, Brazil alongside Juan Pablo Forero, Arles Castro and Jairo Pérez in the Men's Track Team Pursuit. He competed at the 2008 Summer Olympics in Beijing, PR China.

Major results

2003
1st in Aguascalientes, Team Pursuit

2nd National Points Race Championships
2004
1st Stage 4 Vuelta a Colombia Sub-23
2005
International Cycling Classic
1st Stages 7 & 13
3rd National Individual Pursuit Championships
 Pan American Championships, Track, Team Pursuit
2006
1st Stage 8 Vuelta a El Salvador
2007
1st Stage 4 Vuelta al Valle del Cauca
Pan American Championships
1st Individual pursuit
1st Team pursuit (alongside Jairo Pérez, Arles Castro, and Juan Pablo Forero)
 Pan American Games, Track, Team Pursuit

2008
1st Stage 12 International Cycling Classic
2009
1st Stage 5 Vuelta a Cundinamarca
2011
1st 13th Annual Ontario GP 
3rd Roswell Criterium
3rd Beaufort Memorial Classic
3rd Global Imports Sandy Springs Cycling Challenge
4th Sea Otter Classic Criterium
6th Sea Otter Classic Circuit Race
2012
1st Circuito Feria de Manizales
1st USA Crits speedweek Walterboro Criterium
1st USA Crits speedweek Sandy Springs Criterium
1st Stage 2 Nature Valley Grand Prix
1st Stage 4 Cascade Classic
2nd Sunny King Criterium
2013
1st Sunny King Criterium
1st Costal Empire Cycling Festival
1st USA Crits speedweek
1st Belmont Criterium
1st Tour de Grove
1st Base Camp International Basking Ridge
2nd Glencoe GP
2nd Chris Thater memorial Criterium
3rd USA Crits Finals, Las Vegas
2014
1st Charlotte Belmont Omnium
1st Sunny King Criterium
9th Winston Salem Cycling Classic Criterium
2015
7th Dana Point Grand Prix
7th Wilmington Grand Prix
8th Winston-Salem Classic Criterium
2016
1st Stage 3 Joe Martin Stage Race
2nd Clarendon Cup
2017
3rd Overall Tour of Taihu Lake

References

External links
 
 

1983 births
Living people
Sportspeople from Valle del Cauca Department
Colombian male cyclists
Colombian track cyclists
Cyclists at the 2007 Pan American Games
Olympic cyclists of Colombia
Cyclists at the 2008 Summer Olympics
Pan American Games silver medalists for Colombia
Pan American Games medalists in cycling
Central American and Caribbean Games silver medalists for Colombia
Competitors at the 2002 Central American and Caribbean Games
Competitors at the 2006 Central American and Caribbean Games
South American Games gold medalists for Colombia
South American Games medalists in cycling
Competitors at the 2010 South American Games
Central American and Caribbean Games medalists in cycling
Medalists at the 2007 Pan American Games
20th-century Colombian people
21st-century Colombian people